The Whip Hand is a 1965 spy novel by the British writer Victor Canning. It is the first in a series of four novels about Rex Carver, a private detective drawn back into his old profession of espionage. The novel also features the secret service agent Manston who had previously appeared in The Limbo Line, Canning's previous novel.

Synopsis
Carver is hired to find Katerina, a missing German au pair who has gone missing in Brighton. His pursuit takes him to Paris, Dubrovnik, Venice and finally to Germany, where he finds the matter revolves around former Nazis.

References

Bibliography
 Burton, Alan. Historical Dictionary of British Spy Fiction. Rowman & Littlefield, 2016.
Murphy, Bruce F. The Encyclopedia of Murder and Mystery. Springer, 1999.
 Reilly, John M. Twentieth Century Crime & Mystery Writers. Springer, 2015.

1965 British novels
British spy novels
British thriller novels
Novels by Victor Canning
Novels set in London
Novels set in Brighton
Novels set in Venice
Novels set in Yugoslavia
Novels set in Paris
Heinemann (publisher) books